Davoud Mohammadi is an Iranian reformist politician who is currently a member of the Parliament of Iran representing Tehran, Rey, Shemiranat and Eslamshahr electoral district.

Career 
Mohammadi was formerly security deputy of Fars Province governor and temporary governor of Jahrom County.

Electoral history

References

Living people
Iranian reformists
Members of the 10th Islamic Consultative Assembly
People from Qom
Islamic Association of Teachers of Iran politicians
Secretaries-General of political parties in Iran
Year of birth missing (living people)